Daniel Javier Servitje Montull (born 1 April 1959) is a Mexican billionaire businessman, and the president and CEO of Grupo Bimbo, the world's largest bakery company.

Early life
Servitje was born on 1 April 1959 in Mexico City, Mexico, the son of Lorenzo Servitje, and the youngest of eight children.

Servitje earned a bachelor's degree from Universidad Iberoamericana, and an MBA from Stanford University.

Career
Servitje has been CEO of Grupo Bimbo since May 2007, and president and CEO since July 2013.

Servitje is a board member of ITAM Business School, Grocery Manufacturers of America, and the Instituto Mexicano para la Competitividad.

In 2018, Servitje received the Distinguished Leadership Award for Corporate Responsibility from the Inter-American Dialogue.

Personal life
Servitje lives in Mexico City, Mexico.

References

Mexican billionaires
Mexican chief executives
20th-century Mexican businesspeople
21st-century Mexican businesspeople
Living people
Stanford University alumni
Universidad Iberoamericana alumni
Businesspeople from Mexico City
1959 births
Grupo Bimbo people